Platonic is an upcoming American comedy streaming television series created by Nick Stoller and Francesca Delbanco that is set to premiere on Apple TV+.

Cast and characters

Main
 Rose Byrne as Sylvia
 Seth Rogen as Will
 Luke Macfarlane as Charlie
 Tre Hale as Andy
 Carla Gallo as Katie
 Andrew Lopez as Reggie

Recurring
 Alisha Wainwright as Audrey
 Guy Branum as Stewart
 Janet Varney as Vanessa
 Emily Kimball as Peyton
 Vinny Thomas as Omar

Production

Development
On October 15, 2020, Apple TV+ gave the production a series order consisting of 10 half-hour long episodes. The series is created by Nick Stoller and Francesca Delbanco who are also expected executive produced alongside Rose Byrne, Seth Rogen, and Conor Welch. Stoller Global Solutions and Sony Pictures Television are producing the series. Stoller is also set to direct the series.

Casting
Upon series order announcement, Byrne and Rogen were also cast in undisclosed starring roles. On May 5, 2022, Luke Macfarlane, Tre Hale, Carla Gallo, and Andrew Lopez joined the main cast. On June 29, 2022, Alisha Wainwright, Guy Branum, Janet Varney, Emily Kimball, and Vinny Thomas were cast in recurring roles.

Filming
Filming began by May 2022, with production taking place in Los Angeles.

References

External links
 

Apple TV+ original programming
American comedy television series
English-language television shows
Upcoming comedy television series
Television series by Sony Pictures Television